Naamans Creek (spelled Naaman Creek on federal maps) is a tributary of the Delaware River in northeast New Castle County, Delaware and southeast Delaware County, Pennsylvania. The creek is believed to be named after a Minqua chief who befriended the Swedish settlers of the area. A large tract of land along the creek was deeded to Governor Johan Risingh by chief Peminacka in 1655.

See also
 List of rivers of Delaware
 List of rivers of Pennsylvania

References

Rivers of Delaware
Rivers of Pennsylvania
Tributaries of the Delaware River
Rivers of New Castle County, Delaware
Rivers of Delaware County, Pennsylvania
Delaware placenames of Native American origin